Alex  Djornobuah Tetteh is a Ghanaian politician. He is a deputy minister for Western North and member of the Seventh Parliament of the Fourth Republic of Ghana representing the Sefwi-Akontombra Constituency in the Western North Region on the ticket of the New Patriotic Party.

He lobbied for the construction of the Wiawso-Akontombra road which the previous government abandoned.

References

Ghanaian MPs 2017–2021
1972 births
Living people
New Patriotic Party politicians
Ghanaian MPs 2021–2025